The 17th West Virginia Infantry Regiment was an infantry regiment that served in the Union Army during the American Civil War.

Service
The 17th West Virginia Infantry Regiment was organized at Wheeling in West Virginia between 26 September 1864 and 25 February 1865, and was mustered out on 30 June 1865.

Casualties
The 17th West Virginia Infantry Regiment suffered one enlisted men killed or mortally wounded in battle and 24 enlisted men dead from disease for a total of 25 fatalities.

President Joseph Robinette Biden's great-grandfather, Pvt. George Hamilton Robinette, served in the Regiment in 1864 and 1865.

See also
West Virginia Units in the Civil War
West Virginia in the Civil War

References
The Civil War Archive

Units and formations of the Union Army from West Virginia
1864 establishments in West Virginia
Military units and formations established in 1864
Military units and formations disestablished in 1865